The Shillong Times is an Indian newspaper. It is North-East India's oldest English-language daily newspaper, which started as a tabloid-sized weekly on 10 August 1945, on a treadle machine in Shillong.

The Shillong Times switched to a modern computer typesetting and offset printing technique on 15 August 1991, and the first issue in broadsheet format came into being.

A second edition from the town of Tura in the Garo Hills of Meghalaya was launched on 9 November 1992.

Besides the Tura edition, Shillong Times Private Limited also publishes the only Garo language daily Salantini Janera.

The publication is headed by Patricia Mukhim as its editor, who succeeded Manas Chaudhuri in 2008. Chaudhuri had been editor of the paper since 1978.

References

External links
 The Shillong Times website

English-language newspapers published in India
Shillong
1945 establishments in India
Newspapers established in 1945
Mass media in Meghalaya